Haran may refer to:
 Haran, Isfahan (هران - Harān)
 Haran, Markazi (هرن -Haran)